Gerhard "Gerd" Prokop (18 May 1939 – 23 January 2002) was a German football player and manager.

He played for SV Zweckel (1957–61), Sportfreunde Gladbeck (1961–63), Alemannia Aachen (1963–70 and 1974–76) and K.A.S. Eupen (1970–74).

He managed Alemannia Aachen, Westfalia Herne, Holstein Kiel, SG Union Solingen, Apollon Smyrni (1982–83, 1984–85 and 1986–87), PAS Giannina (part of 1983-84,1985–86 and part of 1986-87), Aris Thessaloniki (1987–88), Doxa Drama (1988–89 and 1992), Apollon Kalamarias (1989–90 and 1993–94), Athinaikos (1990–91 and 1997–98), Ionikos (1992), AC Omonia (1994–96), EN Paralimni (1996–97) and Niki Volos.

References

1939 births
2002 deaths
People from Gladbeck
Sportspeople from Münster (region)
German footballers
Association football goalkeepers
Alemannia Aachen players
K.A.S. Eupen players
Bundesliga players
2. Bundesliga players
German football managers
Alemannia Aachen managers
SC Westfalia Herne managers
SG Union Solingen managers
PAS Giannina F.C. managers
Aris Thessaloniki F.C. managers
Ionikos F.C. managers
AC Omonia managers
Enosis Neon Paralimni FC managers
Apollon Pontou FC managers
Apollon Smyrnis F.C. managers
Niki Volos F.C. managers
Holstein Kiel managers
German expatriate footballers
German expatriate football managers
German expatriate sportspeople in Greece
Expatriate football managers in Cyprus
German expatriate sportspeople in Cyprus
Expatriate football managers in Greece
German expatriate sportspeople in Belgium
Expatriate footballers in Belgium
Footballers from North Rhine-Westphalia